José Domingo Molina Gómez (26 September 1896 – 5 April 1969) was the Commander and Chief of the Argentine Army who appears to have temporarily taken "the reins of Government" on September 19, 1955. This was following the Revolución Libertadora which had begun on September 16, 1955. Eduardo Lonardi would eventually be recognized as the de facto President of Argentina on September 23, 1955.

Grandson of former president of Argentina Nicolás Avellaneda

Biography
Born in San Fernando del Valle de Catamarca on September 26, 1896, was the son of Daniel Molina Avellaneda and Melitona Gómez. His grandfather was Nicolás Avellaneda, former president of Argentina. In his early career, José Domingo married Delina del Carmen Botana in Choya, Santiago del Estero.

He was appointed as Director General of the National Gendarmerie Argentina from 1945 to 1947. He was then appointed as the Commander and Chief of the Argentine Army.

The Revolución Libertadora began on September 16, 1955. On September 19, 1955 President Juan Perón wrote what appeared to be a resignation letter.

A military junta composed of general José Domingo Molina and other military officers, was created with Molina at "the reins of Government". The next morning Perón asked for asylum in Paraguay, leaving the government in the hands of the military junta. Eduardo Lonardi would eventually be recognized as the de facto President of Argentina on September 23, 1955.

On October 3, 1955 Molina was arrested by Eduardo Lonardi and later released.

He died in Buenos Aires on 5 April 1969 at the age of 72.

Sources

1896 births
1969 deaths
People from Buenos Aires
Argentine generals